The Popcorn Kid is an American sitcom that aired on CBS from March 23, 1987 to April 24, 1987.

Premise
A 16-year-old working behind the candy counter of a movie theater dreams of someday being in show business.

Cast
Bruce Norris as Scott Creasman, the "Popcorn Kid" of the series' title and, of course, the protagonist. A well-meaning yet trouble-prone sixteen-year-old high school student living in Kansas City, he is also an avid film enthusiast with dreams of making it big in movies. So far though, the closest he has come to achieving that dream is working as an usher and manning the candy counter at the Majestic Theatre, a local movie theatre that has seen better days.
Raye Birk as Mr. Leonard Brown, the balding, disgruntled manager of the Majestic Theatre. Although Scott is often skating on thin ice where he is concerned, Mr. Brown never carries out his frequent threats to fire him, probably because Scott has helped him to save some face on more than one occasion. When he is not at the ticket booth or shut up in his office going over the books, he is coming up with schemes to make more money for the theatre and impress the owner Mr. Tuttle, which usually prove ineffective. He is normally very conservative, but has been known to go berserk when things go really wrong. His one soft spot seems to be his wife Lorraine, whom he wants to please almost as badly as he wants to please Mr. Tuttle. 
Jeffrey Joseph as Willie Dawson, a football star at the same high school Scott attends, and the only other male usher at the Majestic. He views his potential career in football primarily as a means of attracting girls. Often he shows up late to work because of football practice, but invariably avoids getting caught by Mr. Brown.
Penelope Ann Miller as Gwen Stottlemeyer, another student from the same high school as the other ushers at the Majestic Theatre. Although she sometimes comes across as snarky, she is a loyal friend to Scott, on whom she has a secret crush, and also has been known to offer help or advice to other people, even Mr. Brown. She frequently gets exasperated with her fellow usherette Lynn Holly over the fact that while Gwen is rarely recognized for the hard work she does, Lynn Holly effortlessly skates by on good looks and her parents' wealth.
John Christopher Jones as Marlin Bond, the projectionist at the theatre. Although Marlin is older and a bit of an oddball, Scott shares a bond with him over their mutual love of movies, and often hangs out with him in the projection booth despite the fact he is not supposed to be there. Marlin lives in a perennial cloudland in and out of his booth, quoting and acting out scenes from old movies, but he occasionally drops some good advice amidst his ramblings.
Faith Ford as Lynn Holly Brickhouse, a spoiled, ditzy blonde cheerleader at the same high school her co-workers at the Majestic go to. She is the newest member of the staff, and got the job through her wealthy parents' influence. Scott has a hopeless crush on her, but despite the fact that he sits behind her at school, she barely knows he's alive. She is often either sitting on the candy counter chatting with her friends on her cell phone or preening herself in front of the mirror in the staff washroom, much to the annoyance of the other ushers.

Episodes

References

External links
 
TV Guide

1987 American television series debuts
1987 American television series endings
1980s American teen sitcoms
1980s American workplace comedy television series
CBS original programming
English-language television shows
Television series about teenagers
Television series by MTM Enterprises
Television shows set in Kansas City, Missouri